Volunteer Lawyers for the Arts (VLA) is both a generic term for legal service organizations located throughout the United States and the proper name of the organization in New York City. Founded in 1969, that organization is the oldest VLA in the country.

Organizations
The first VLA organization, named simply Volunteer Lawyers for the Arts, was founded in 1969 and serves the New York area out of its Manhattan office. Chicago-based lawyers for the Creative Arts was founded in 1972. Bay Area Lawyers for the Arts (BALA) was founded two years later. When BALA expanded to Southern California, joining with Volunteer Lawyers for the Arts-Los Angeles, the organization was renamed California Lawyers for the Arts. Denver-based Colorado Lawyers for the Arts began operations in 1974, incorporated in 1979 and continues to serve that state's arts community.

Among the newer Volunteer Lawyers for the Arts organizations are New Jersey Volunteer Lawyers for the Arts, Inc. and Kansas City Volunteer Lawyers and Accountants for the Arts, both founded in 2004. More recent still, Tennessee Lawyers for the Arts, which opened in Nashville in 2005.

There are more than 30 VLA programs throughout the United States. Not a single organization, but rather a network united by similar missions, the organizations provide a broad range of free and low-cost legal services and educational programs addressing the needs of artists and arts organizations of all artistic disciplines.

Each VLA organization operates independently. Most are nonprofit organizations, while others are housed with arts councils, arts services organizations, bar associations or business for the arts programs.

Services
Some of the programs provided include:

Legal services through referrals and, in some cases, on-site consultations; legal clinics; alternative dispute resolution services, including mediation and arbitration; accounting services; law student internships; advocacy; educational programs on such topics as contracts, copyright, estate planning, taxes and nonprofit incorporation; and publications on a broad range of topics.

Without these services provided by these organizations, many arts-related legal problems would go unresolved and many artists would be denied an opportunity to develop their creative abilities fully.

Organizations

Arizona
Volunteer Legal Assistance for Artists, Arizona

California
Beverly Hills Bar Association Barristers Committee for the Arts
300 S. Beverly Dr., Ste. 201
Beverly Hills, CA 90212
(310) 601-2422

California Lawyers for the Arts (Sacramento)
1127 Eleventh St. #214
Sacramento, CA 95814
(916) 442-6210

California Lawyers for the Arts (San Francisco)
Fort Mason Center, Building C, Rm 255
San Francisco, CA 94123
(415) 775-7200

California Lawyers for the Arts (Santa Monica)
1641 18th St.
Santa Monica, CA 90404
(310) 998-5590

San Diego Performing Arts League
110 West C St. #1414
San Diego, CA 92101
(619) 238-0700 x. 16

Colorado
Colorado Lawyers for the Arts
720-272-0961

District of Columbia

Washington Area Lawyers for the Arts
1629 K Street, NW, Suite 300
Washington, DC 20006
(202) 289-4440

Florida
Legal Art
924 Lincoln Rd. #205
Miami Beach, FL 33139
(305) 674-8278

Florida Lawyers for the Arts, Inc.
PO Box 2091
St. Petersburg, FL 33731
(727) 823-5809

Georgia
Georgia Lawyers for the Arts
887 West Marietta St. NW, Suite J-101
Atlanta, GA 30318
(404) 873-3911

Illinois
Lawyers for the Creative Arts
161 N. Clark St.,
Suite 4300
Chicago, IL 60601
(312) 649-4111

Indiana
Creative Arts Legal League
20 N. Meridian St. #500
Indianapolis, IN 46204

Iowa
Iowa Volunteer Lawyers for the Arts
c/o David J. Bright
122 South Linn St.
Iowa City, IA 522240

Louisiana
Louisiana Volunteer Lawyers for the Arts
818 Howard St.
New Orleans, LA 70113
(504) 523-2430

Maine
Maine Volunteer Lawyers for the Arts
P.O. Box 17911
511 Congress St.
Portland, ME  04112-17911
(207) 699-4600

Maryland
Maryland Volunteer Lawyers for the Arts
1500 Union Ave., Suite 1330
Baltimore, MD 21211
(410) 752-1633

Massachusetts
Volunteer Lawyers for the Arts of Massachusetts
15 Channel Center Street
Suite 103
Boston, MA 02210
(617) 350-7600

Michigan
Creative Many Michigan
440 Burroughs Street, Suite 365
Detroit, Michigan 48202
(313) 483-5705

Minnesota
Springboard for the Arts
308 Prince St.
St. Paul, MN 55101
(651) 292-4381

Missouri
KC Volunteer Lawyers and Accountants for the Arts
115 W. 18th St.
Kansas City, MO 64108
(816) 472-3535

St. Louis Volunteer Lawyers and Accountants for the Arts
6128 Delmar
St. Louis, MO 63112
(314) 863-6930

New Hampshire
New Hampshire Business Committee for the Arts
One Granite Pl.
Concord, NH 03301
(603) 224-8300

New Jersey
New Jersey Volunteer Lawyers for the Arts
P.O. Box 2265
Flemington, NJ 08822
(856) 963-6300

New York
Volunteer Lawyers for the Arts
729 Seventh Avenue
New York, NY 10019
(212) 319-2787

North Carolina
North Carolina Volunteer Lawyers for the Arts
PO Box 26513
Raleigh, NC 26513
(919) 699-6285

Ohio
Volunteer Lawyers for the Arts Program
Cleveland Bar Association
1301 E 9th St.
Cleveland, OH 44114
(216) 696-3525

Oregon
Oregon Volunteer Lawyers for the Arts

Portland, OR

Pennsylvania
Philadelphia Volunteer Lawyers for the Arts
(Arts and Business Council)
200 S. Broad St.
Philadelphia, PA 19102
(215) 790-3836 x1

Greater Pittsburgh Arts Council
707 Penn Ave. #2
Pittsburgh, PA 15222
(412) 391-2060

Rhode Island
Ocean State Lawyers for the Arts
PO Box 19
Saunderstown, RI 02874
(401) 789-5686

Tennessee
Tennessee Volunteer Lawyers for the Arts
1900 Belmont Blvd.
Nashville, TN 37212
(615) 460-8274

Texas
Texas Accountants & Lawyers for the Arts
PO Box 144722
Austin, TX 78714
(800) 526-8252

Washington
Washington Lawyers for the Arts
6512 23rd St. NW #320
Seattle, WA 98117
(206) 328-7053

Wisconsin
Arts Wisconsin
PO Box 1054
Madison, WI 53701
(608) 255-8316

References

 Figueras, Ligaya. Low-Cost Legal and Accounting Assistance for Artists, Art Calendar, October 2008

Legal organizations based in the United States